Saint Bavo's Cathedral, also known as Sint-Baafs Cathedral, is a cathedral of the Catholic Church in Ghent, Belgium. The 89-meter-tall Gothic building is the seat of the Diocese of Ghent and is named for Saint Bavo of Ghent. It contains the well-known Ghent Altarpiece.

History

The cathedral stands on the site of the former Chapel of St. John the Baptist, which was primarily of wooden construction and was consecrated in 942 by Transmarus, Bishop of Tournai and Noyon. Traces of a later Romanesque structure can be found in the cathedral's crypt. Construction of the Gothic church began around 1274.

In the subsequent period from the 14th through 16th centuries, nearly continuous expansion projects in the Gothic style were executed on the structure. A new choir, radiating chapels, expansions of the transepts, a chapter house, nave aisles and a single-tower western section were all added. 

In 1539, as a result of the rebellion against Charles V, who was baptized in the church, the old Abbey of St. Bavo was dissolved. Its abbot and monks went on to become canons in a Chapter that was attached to what then became the Church of Saint Bavo. When the Diocese of Ghent was founded in 1559, the church became its cathedral. Construction was considered complete on June 7, 1569.

In the summer of 1566, bands of Calvinist iconoclasts visited Catholic churches in the Netherlands, shattering stained-glass windows, smashing statues, and destroying paintings and other artworks they perceived as idolatrous. However, the altarpiece by the Van Eycks was saved.

Interior

Ghent Altarpiece
The cathedral is noted for the Ghent Altarpiece, originally in the Joost Vijd Chapel. It is formally known as the Adoration of the Mystic Lamb after its lower centre panel by Hubert and Jan van Eyck. This work is considered Van Eyck's masterpiece and one of the most important works of the early Northern Renaissance, as well as one of the greatest artistic masterpieces of Belgium. Part of the painting, the lowermost left panel known as The Just Judges, was stolen in 1934 and has not been recovered. It has since been replaced with a facsimile by Jef Van der Veken.

Other religious art
The cathedral is home to the works of other artists of note. It holds the painting Saint Bavo enters the Convent at Ghent by Peter Paul Rubens. There are also works by or after Lucas de Heere, one of which is a View of Gent. Frans Pourbus the Elder painted 14 panels representing the History of Saint Andrew (1572) and a Triptych of Viglius Aytta (1571). Caspar de Crayer is represented by paintings of St Macarius of Gent, The Beheading of Saint John the Baptist and The Martyrdom of Saint Barbara. The church also holds works by Antoon van den Heuvel including the Christ and the Adulterous Woman and the Resurrection of Christ. There are also works by Lucas van Uden and Jan van Cleef.

Local Ghent painter Petrus Norbertus van Reysschoot painted a series of 11 grisailles, which decorate the choir of the cathedral, above the stalls. Five of these panels represent scenes from the Old Testament while the other six episodes from the New Testament. These paintings were placed in the cathedral between 1789 and 1791.

Organs 
The cathedral has four organs for use at liturgical celebrations. Most famous is the main organ in the Upper church, the biggest organ in the Benelux. In 1935 Mgr Coppieters commanded that the Klais organ from the world exhibition would be put inside the cathedral. The organ case dates from the 18th century and the complete organ has more than 6000 pipes inside. It has 5 manuals.

Choir 

The most impressive part is the high choir with stalls for the members of the Chapter of Saint-Bavon. The episcopal throne is located on the right side with the episcopal arms visible. Highlights of the interior decoration of the choir include the Baroque high altar (1702–1782), in white, black, and red flamed marble, and the tomb monuments of Ghent bishops, including that of Antonius Triest, in white and black marble (1652–1654), a major work of Jerôme Duquesnoy (II). On the right side is the gallery with painted crests of the members of the Order of the Golden Fleece.

In the choir is the 1559 painting The Queen of Sheba visits King Solomon by the Flemish artist Lucas de Heere. This allegorical work depicts King Solomon as Philip II of Spain, recognizable by his facial features, receiving gifts from the Queen of Sheba, an allegory of the Low Countries, representing that country donating its riches to the Spanish king in thanks for his prudent government.

Nave 
In the nave we find an impressive rococo pulpit (1741–1745), made in oak, gilded wood and white and black marble by Laurent Delvaux, with wrought-iron railings by J. Arens. There are also chairs designed by the contemporary designer Maarten Van Severen. The main altar is placed between the nave and the choir.

Treasury and crypt 
In the Chapel of the Holiest an important Calvary Triptych is on display. This 15th-century work is attributed to Justus van Gent. Finally, there is a valuable collection of important liturgical plates, reliquaries, and liturgical vessels dating from the 15th century onward. Among the important reliquaries are the head of Saint John the Baptist and of Saint Macarius. The important collection of hand-embroidered and brocaded liturgical ornaments is widely known as one of the most important of the country, some of which are put on display.

Chapter of Saint-Bavo 

Still today the chapter is housed inside the cathedral, since its foundation. Members have been important prelates and members of noble houses. Today Jozef De Kesel is one of the honorary canons. The chapters of Haarlem and Ghent are united in friendship. Weekly the canons sing Mass with the bishop.

 Maximilian van de Woestyne de Becelaere, died 1699: nephew of the Marquess of Becelaere
 Jacques Ignace van Parys, died 1702: grandson of Rubens.
 Constant van Crombrugghe
 François III Maria Rubens, died 1720: great-grandson of Rubens.
 Petrus Joseph Triest, founder of the Brothers of Charity
 Thomas-Philip d'Alsace, Cardinal
 Antoon Stillemans, before he was ordained bishop
 Gustaaf Joos, before he was created cardinal
 Jozef De Kesel, honorary Canon
 Lode Aerts, before he was ordained bishop

Burials 
 Cornelius Jansen (1510–1576), first Bishop of Ghent (1565–1576)
 Pieter Damant (1530-1609), third Bishop of Ghent (1589-1609)
 Karl vanden Bosch, Bishop of Ghent
 Karel Justinus Calewaert, (1893–1963): 27th Bishop of Ghent (1948–1963)
 Prince Ferdinand de Lobkowitz (1726–1795) Bishop of Ghent, 1779–1795
 Philippus Erardus van der Noot, baroque tomb by Jan Boeksent.
 Jan de Smet, Bishop of Ghent
 Jan-Frans van de Velde (1779–1838), 20th Bishop of Ghent.
 Gerard van Eersel (died 1778), Bishop of Ghent
 Ignace Schetz de Grobbendonk (1625–1680), 11th Bishop of Ghent (1679–1680)
 Michelle of Valois, Duchess of Burgundy

See also 
 Bishop of Ghent
 List of Gothic Cathedrals in Europe
 List of tallest structures built before the 20th century

References

External links 

 

Roman Catholic cathedrals in Belgium
Roman Catholic churches in Ghent
Gothic architecture in Belgium
Romanesque architecture in Belgium
Churches in East Flanders
Burial sites of the Pippinids
10th-century establishments in Belgium
Tourism in Belgium
10th-century churches
Religious buildings and structures completed in 942